Psi Sigma Phi Multicultural Fraternity, Inc. was founded December 12, 1990, at Montclair State University and New Jersey City University. The Eighteen Founding Fathers believed that multiculturalism is not indicative of the physical composition of an organization on a chapter or national level; it is viewed as a state of mind––a philosophy that embraces any and all aspects of cultural identity with unconditional respect and equality.

About Psi Sigma Phi 

Psi Sigma Phi Multicultural Fraternity Inc. was co-founded on December 12, 1990, at Montclair State University and New Jersey City University (at the time Jersey City State College) as a service-oriented, multicultural fraternity.

At the time of its founding, male college students could join only mainstream fraternities or fraternities that were predominantly Latin-American, African-American, or Asian-American. Psi Sigma Phi's founders created the fraternity to emphasize the importance of multiculturalism in the lives of college students.

Psi Sigma Phi's fraternal goal is to establish a unique bond among men of different cultures. This goal is to be accomplished through hard work, sacrifice and courage from all of its brothers - brothers who together strive to break social fears and ignorance.

Philanthropy 
Psi Sigma Phi's national philanthropy is the Kidney and Urology Foundation. Other services participated in on a national level include:

City Year
Multiple Sclerosis Walk (New Jersey)
Juvenile Diabetes Foundation (Walk)
Hyacinth AIDS Walk
SHU 500 (Seton Hall University)
Food Bank of New Jersey
American Cancer Society
Valerie Fund
Newark Soup Kitchens
Dove Services (Seton Hall University)
Adopt a Highway Program

Chapters and Colonies 

Patriarch Alpha - Montclair State University, New Jersey*
Baronet Beta - New Jersey City University, New Jersey
Gallant Gamma - Seton Hall University, New Jersey
Dynast Delta - Kean University, New Jersey*
Elite Epsilon - Rutgers University-New Brunswick, New Jersey
Zulu Zeta - Ramapo College, New Jersey
Heroic Eta - Utah State University, Utah
Triumphant Theta - North Jersey, New Jersey
Infinite Iota - Pennsylvania State University, Pennsylvania*
Cryptik Kappa - University of North Carolina at Chapel Hill, North Carolina*
LeCypher Lambda - Shippensburg University, Pennsylvania*
Valiant Mu - University of North Carolina at Charlotte, North Carolina
Imperial Nu - Weber State University, Utah
Xalted Xi - Temple University, Pennsylvania
Eternal Omicron - Rowan University, New Jersey
Prodigal Pi - University of North Carolina at Greensboro, North Carolina
Relentless Rho - Caldwell University, New Jersey
Eminent Sigma - Felician University, New Jersey
Immortal Tau - Bloomfield College, New Jersey
Resilient Upsilon - Virginia Commonwealth University, Virginia
Fearless Phi - Colorado College, Colorado 
(*) Inactive

See also
Multiculturalism
Multicultural education
National Multicultural Greek Council

References

External links 
Psi Sigma Phi Multicultural Fraternity's national website
National Multicultural Greek Council

Montclair State University
New Jersey City University
National Multicultural Greek Council
Student organizations established in 1990
Multiculturalism in the United States
Fraternities and sororities in the United States
Hispanic and Latino American organizations
International student societies
1990 establishments in New Jersey